Several vessels have been named Malvina for Malvina:
 was launched in 1796 in the United States. She first appeared in British on-line sources in 1800 as a West Indiaman. She made one voyage as a slave ship in the triangular trade in enslaved persons between May 1803 and late 1804, when she was captured.
 was a privateer brig from Nantes commissioned circa 1807. The Royal Navy captured her in 1808.

Ship names